James Allan Turney (8 July 1922 – 8 July 1995) was an English footballer who made 40 appearances in the Football League playing as a winger for Darlington. He previously played non-league football for Blyth Shipyard and Blackhall Colliery Welfare, and went on to play for Blyth Spartans, eventually spending ten years as manager and becoming long serving chairman.

References

1922 births
1995 deaths
People from Cramlington
Footballers from Northumberland
English footballers
Association football wingers
Blackhall Colliery Welfare F.C. players
Darlington F.C. players
Blyth Spartans A.F.C. players
English Football League players
English football managers
Blyth Spartans A.F.C. managers